John Melchior Bosco, SDB (16 August 181531 January 1888), popularly known as Don Bosco , was an Italian Catholic priest, educator, writer and saint of the 19th century.
While working in Turin, where the population suffered many of the ill-effects of industrialization and urbanization, he dedicated his life to the betterment and education of street children, juvenile delinquents, and other disadvantaged youth. He developed teaching methods based on love rather than punishment, a method that became known as the Salesian Preventive System.

A follower of the spirituality and philosophy of Francis de Sales, Bosco was an ardent devotee of the Virgin Mary, under the title Mary Help of Christians. He later dedicated his works to de Sales when he founded the Salesians of Don Bosco, based in Turin. Together with Maria Domenica Mazzarello, he founded the Institute of the Daughters of Mary Help of Christians, now commonly known as the Salesian Sisters of Don Bosco, a religious congregation of nuns dedicated to the care and education of poor girls. He taught Dominic Savio, of whom he wrote a biography that helped the young boy be canonized.

He is one of the pioneers of Mutual Aid Societies that were initiated as collaborative financial support to young migrant Catholic workers in the city of Turin. In 1850 he drew up regulations to assist apprentices and their companions when any of them was involuntarily without work or fell ill.
   
On 18 April 1869, one year after the construction of the Basilica of Mary Help of Christians in Turin, Don Bosco established the Association of Mary Help of Christians (ADMA) connecting it with commitments easily fulfilled by most common people, to the spirituality and the mission of the Salesian Congregation (CG 24 SDB, 1996, NR. 80). The ADMA was founded to promote the veneration of the Most Holy Sacrament and Mary Help of Christians (Don Bosco, Association of the Devotees of Mary Help of Christians, San Benigno Canavese, 1890, page 33).

In 1875, he began to publish the Salesian Bulletin. The Bulletin has remained in continuous publication, and is currently published in 50 different editions and 30 languages. In 1876, Bosco founded a movement of laity, the Association of Salesian Cooperators, with the same educational mission to the poor.

Bosco established a network of organizations and centres to carry on his work. Following his beatification in 1929, he was canonized as a Catholic saint by [Pope Pius XI]] in 1934.

Life
John Bosco was born on the evening of 16 August 1815 in the hillside hamlet of Becchi, Italy. Becchi is located in a region that was called Castelnuovo d'Asti, which was later renamed Castelnuovo Don Bosco in honour of the saint. He was the youngest son of Francesco Bosco (1784–1817) and Margherita Occhiena. He had two older brothers, Antonio and Giuseppe (1813–1862). The Boscos of Becchi were farmhands of the Moglian Family. John Bosco was born in a time of great shortage and famine in the Piedmontese countryside, following the devastation wrought by the Napoleonic Wars and drought in 1817.

When he was little more than two years old, his father, Francesco, died, which left the support of three boys to his mother, Margherita. She played a strong role in Bosco's formation and personality, and was an early supporter of her son's ideals.

In 1825, when he was nine, Bosco had the first of a series of dreams that would play an influential role in his outlook and work. This first dream "left a profound impression on him for the rest of his life", according to his own memoirs. Bosco apparently saw a multitude of very poor boys playing and blaspheming and a man, who "appeared, nobly attired, with a manly and imposing bearing" and said to him, "You will have to win these friends of yours not with blows, but with gentleness and kindness. So begin right now to show them that sin is ugly and virtue beautiful".

Bosco, when he was ten years old at the festive oratory, started watching his classmates' attitudes, and in every fight was the referee. The older boys were scared of him because he knew their strengths and their weaknesses.

When traveling entertainers performed at a local feast in the nearby hills, he watched and studied the jugglers' tricks and the acrobats' secrets. Then, he would put on shows of his skills as a juggler, magician, and acrobat with prayers before and after the performance. The money that he needed to prepare all the shows was taken from selling the birds that he hunted and given to him by his mother because she trusted him.

Poverty prevented any serious attempt at schooling. His early years were spent as a shepherd, and he received his first instruction from Don Calosso who "was impressed by John’s memory and understanding of
the sermons he had heard at a parish mission in a nearby Church." His childhood experiences are thought to have inspired him to become a priest. Being a priest was then more commonly a profession for the privileged classes than for farmers. Some biographers portray his older brother, Antonio, as the main obstacle for Bosco's ambition to study, as Antonio protested that John was just "a farmer like us!"

On a cold morning in February 1827, John left his home and went to look for work as a farm servant. At 12, he found life at home unbearable because of the continuous quarrels with Antonio. Having to face life by himself at such a young age may have developed his later sympathies to help abandoned boys. After begging unsuccessfully for work, he ended up at the wine farm of Louis Moglia. Although he could pursue some studies by himself, he was not able to attend school for two more years. In 1830, he met Joseph Cafasso, a young priest who identified some natural talent and supported his first schooling. Bosco's mother, Margherita, managed to earn enough money to finance his education. In 1835, Bosco entered the seminary at Chieri, next to the Church of the Immacolata Concezione. In 1841, after six years of study, he was ordained a priest on the eve of Trinity Sunday by Archbishop Franzoni of Turin. He was twenty-six years old.

Priesthood and first apostolates

After ordination, Bosco went to Turin, where Cafasso headed the Institute of Saint Francis of Assisi, which provided higher education for the diocesan priests. Turin then had a population of 117,000 inhabitants. The city reflected the effects of industrialization and urbanization. Numerous poor families lived in the slums of the city and had come from the countryside in search of a better life. During his studies, Bosco accompanied Cafasso in visiting the prisons and became concerned regarding the recidivism of the young offenders. He began to work with orphaned and abandoned boys, teaching them catechism and helping them find work. Upon completion of his studies, Cafasso secured for Bosco an appointment as almoner of the Rifugio ("Refuge"), a girls' boarding school founded in Turin by the Marchioness Giulia di Barolo, so that he could remain in Turin. His other ministries included visiting prisoners, teaching catechism, and helping out at many country parishes.

Because of population growth and migration to the city, Bosco found the traditional methods of parish ministry to be inefficient. He decided that it was necessary to try another form of apostolate, and he began to meet the boys where they worked and gathered in shops and marketplaces. They were pavers, stonecutters, masons, and plasterers who had come from far away, as he recalled in his brief Memoires.

The Oratorio was not simply a charitable institution, and its activities were not limited to Sundays. For Don Bosco, it became his permanent occupation. He looked for jobs for the unemployed. Some of the boys did not have sleeping quarters and slept under bridges or in bleak public dormitories. Twice, he tried to provide lodgings in his house. The first time, they stole the blankets; the second, time, they emptied the hayloft. He did not give up, and in May 1847, he gave shelter to a young boy from Valencia in one of the three rooms he was renting in the slums of Valdocco, where he was living with his mother. He and "Mamma Margherita" began taking in orphans. The boys sheltered by Don Bosco numbered 36 in 1852, 115 in 1854, 470 in 1860, and 600 in 1861, reaching a maximum of 800 sometime later.

Bosco and his oratory moved around town for several years; he was turned out of several places in succession. After only two months based in the church of St. Martin, the entire neighbourhood expressed its annoyance with the noise coming from the boys at play. A formal complaint was lodged against them with the municipality. Rumours also circulated that the meetings conducted by the priest with his boys were dangerous; their recreation could be turned into a revolution against the government. The group was evicted.

Work with apprentices
In the archives of the Salesian Congregation is a contract of apprenticeship, dated November 1851; another one on stamped paper costing 40 cents, dated 8 February 1852; and others have later dates. They are among the first contracts of apprenticeship to be found in Turin. All of them are signed by the employer, the apprentice, and Don Bosco. In those contracts, Don Bosco touched on many sensitive issues. Some employers customarily made servants and scullery boys of the apprentices. Don Bosco obliged them to agree to employ the boys only in their acknowledged trade. Employers used to beat the boys. Don Bosco required them to agree that corrections be made only verbally. He cared for their health and demanded that they be given rest on feast days and an annual holiday. Despite all the efforts and contracts, however, the situation of the apprentices of the time remained difficult.

One influential friend was Piedmontese Justice Minister Urbano Rattazzi. He was anticlerical in his politics but saw some value in Bosco's work. While Rattazzi was pushing a bill through the Sardanian legislature to suppress religious orders, he advised Bosco on how to get around the law. He found a religious order to keep the oratory going after its founder's death. Bosco had been thinking about that problem too and had been slowly organizing his helpers into a loose "Congregation of St. Francis de Sales". He was also training select older boys for the priesthood. Another supporter of the idea to establish a religious order to carry out Bosco's vision was the reigning pope, Pope Pius IX.

Bosco disliked the ideals that had been exported by Revolutionary France and called Rousseau and Voltaire "two vicious leaders of incredulity". He favoured an ultramontane view of politics that acknowledged the supreme authority of the pope. In 1854, when the Kingdom of Sardinia was about to pass a law suppressing monastic orders and confiscating ecclesiastical properties, Bosco reported a series of dreams about "great funerals at court" that referred to politicians or members of the Savoy court.

In November 1854, he sent a letter to King Victor Emmanuel II and admonished him to oppose the confiscation of church property and suppression of the orders, but the King failed to respond. His actions, which had been described by the Italian historian Roberto Petoia as having "manifest blackmailing intentions", ended only after the intervention of Prime Minister Camillo Benso, Count of Cavour. The king's family suffered several deaths in a short period. From January to May 1855, the king's mother (age 54), wife (32), newborn son (Vittorio Emanuele, Count of Genoa; nearly four months old), and his only brother (32) all died.

Opposition to Bosco and his work came from various quarters. Traditionalist clergy accused him of stealing the young and old people away from their own parishes. Nationalist politicians, including some clergy, saw his several hundred young men as a recruiting ground for revolution. The Marquis de Cavour, the chief of police in Turin, regarded the open-air catechisms as overtly political and a threat to the state and was highly suspicious of Bosco's support for the powers of the papacy. Bosco was interrogated on several occasions, but no charges were made. Closure may have been prevented by orders from the king that Bosco was not to be disturbed.

Several attempts were also made on Bosco's life, including a near-stabbing, bludgeoning, and a shooting. Early biographers put that down to the growing influence of the Waldensians in opposition to Catholic clergy.

Foundation of Salesians of Don Bosco

Some of the boys helped by Don Bosco decided to do what he was doing: working in the service of abandoned boys. That was the origin of the Salesian Congregation. Among the first members were Michael Rua, John Cagliero (who later became a Cardinal), and John Baptist Francesca.

In 1859, Bosco selected the experienced priest Vittorio Alasonatti, 15 seminarians, and one high school boy and formed them into the "Society of St. Francis de Sales". That was the nucleus of the Salesians, the religious order that would carry on his work. When the group had its next meeting, it voted on the admission of Joseph Rossi as a lay member, the first Salesian brother. The Salesian Congregation was divided into priests, seminarians, and "coadjutors" (the lay brothers).

Next, he worked with Mary Mazzarello, and a group of girls in the hill town of Mornese. In 1871, he founded a group of religious sisters to do for girls what the Salesians were doing for boys. They were called the "Daughters of Mary Help of Christians". In 1874, he founded yet another group, the "Salesian Cooperators", who mostly lay people who would work for young people like the Daughters and the Salesians but would not join a religious order.

The first Salesians departed for Argentina in 1875. After his ordination, Bosco himself would have become a missionary if his director, Joseph Cafasso, had not opposed the idea. Bosco nevertheless eagerly read the Italian edition of the Annals of the Propagation of the Faith and used this magazine to illustrate his Cattolico Provveduto (1853) and his Month of May booklets (1858).

When Bosco founded the Salesian Society, the thought of the missions still obsessed him, but he then completely lacked the financial means. Bosco claimed that in another dream, he was on a vast plain inhabited by primitive peoples, who spent their time hunting or fighting among themselves or against soldiers in European uniforms. Along came a band of missionaries, but they were all massacred. A second group appeared, which Bosco at once recognized as Salesians. Astonished, he witnessed an unexpected change when the fierce savages laid down their arms and listened to the missionaries. It seems the dream made a great impression on Bosco because he tried hard to identify the men and the country of the dream, and for three years, he collected information about different countries. A request from Argentina turned him towards the Indians of Patagonia, and a study of its people convinced him that the country and its inhabitants were the ones that he had seen in his dream. In late 1874, Bosco received letters from the Argentine consult at Savona requesting that he accept an Italian parish in Buenos Aires and a school for boys at San Nicolas de Los Arroyos. 

Bosco regarded it as a sign of Providence and started to prepare a mission. Adopting a way of evangelization that would not expose his missionaries to wild, "uncivilized" tribes, he proposed setting up bases in safe locations at which missionary efforts were to be launched. Negotiations started after Archbishop Aneiros of Buenos Aires had indicated that he would be glad to receive the Salesians. In a ceremony held on 29 January 1875, Bosco was able to convey the great news to the oratory. On 5 February, he announced the fact in a circular letter to all Salesians asking volunteers to apply in writing. He proposed for the first missionary departure to start in October. There were many volunteers.

Salesian Preventive System and other works

In the years that Bosco had spent running his oratory and giving spiritual and practical instruction to the boys he had housed there, he relied on a different approach on education and general instruction, which he believed to be superior to traditional educational methods, which he labeled as a Repressive System of Education. On 12 March 1877, Bosco gave an opening address on the systems of education during the day for the opening of the St. Peter's Youth Center in the new quarters of the Patronage de Saint Pierre in Nice in which he first mentioned the term 'Preventive System'. Upon his return to Turin, Bosco wrote down the address as a polished essay under the title The Preventive System in the Education of the Youth, which was published in 1877 in which he included in the initial draft of the Rule for the Salesian Order. It espoused the values of reason, Religion, and loving kindness with a goal of producing "good Christians and honest citizens". That was the only attempt that Bosco made at a systematic exposition of his educational system. Though the idea itself was not innovative by any means, Bosco having drawn the inspiration for his system through the contemporary criticisms of the punitive and outdated educational systems prevalent in Europe during his time, and he was one of the first to combat it and to put his criticisms into practice.

Though Bosco's written works were little known outside of his own order and the subscribers of his Salesian Bulletin, which he founded in August 1877, he wrote frequently and voluminously. Though Don Bosco was described as more of a man of action than a scholar, he was an exceptional historian. He penned the 1881 A Compendium of Italian History from the Fall of the Roman Empire, which was translated and continued to the present by John Daniel Morell and was noted by scholars for its cultural importance on the knowledge base of ancient to modern civilization. He was also a skilled biographer. His two most well-known biographies were on his mentor, Joseph Cafasso and one of his students, Dominic Savio, which would later be instrumental in his canonization.

Works
 Works in roughly chronological order
 Catholic Readings (1853-1884)
1853
Announcements for Catholics
The Instructed Catholic 
Historical notes on the miracle of the Blessed Sacrament at Turin 
Fact of our times 
A dispute between a lawyer and a Protestant minister 
Notes on the life of the youth, Luigi Comolli 
The conversion of a Waldensian 
A collection of strange contemporary happenings 
The six Sundays in honour of St Aloysius Gonzaga
The Jubilee 
1855
An easy method of learning Sacred History
Talks on Confession 
Life of St Martin, Bishop of Tours 
The value of a good upbringing 
Life of St Pancras 
1857
Life of St Peter 
Two conferences on Purgatory 
Life of St Paul 
Lives of the Sovereign Pontiffs, Linus, Cletus, and Clement 
Lives of the Sovereign Pontiffs, Anacletus, Evaristus, and Alexander I 
Lives of the Sovereign Pontiffs, Sixtus, Telesphorus, and Hyginus 
1858
Lives of the Sovereign Pontiffs, Anicetus, Soter, Eleutherus, Victor, and Zephirinus 
(The month of May, consecrated to Mary Immaculate 
The Christian's 'Porta Tecum' 
Life of the Sovereign Pontiff, Callistus I 
1859
Life of the youth, Dominic Savio 
Life of the Sovereign Pontiff, Urban I 
Lives of the Sovereign Pontiffs, Pontian, Anteros, and Fabian 
The persecution of Decius and the pontificate of St Cornelius I 
1860
Lives of the Sovereign Pontiffs, St Lucian I and St Stephen I 
The pontificate of St Sixtus II and the glories of St Laurence 
Biography of Fr Joseph Cafasso 
1861
A family of martyrs 
Biographical note on Michael Magone 
The pontificate of St Dionysius 
Biography of Silvio Pellico
1862
The pontificates of St Felix I and St Eutychian 
The new charm of an old soldier of Napoleon 
1863
Historical notes on BI. Catherine De-Mattei 
The pontificate of St Caius
1864
The pontificates of SS Marcellinus and Marcellus 
Episodes pleasant and contemporary 
The little shepherd of the Alps 
1865
The house of fortune 
Dialogues on the jubilee 
The peace of the Church 
Life of BI. Mary of the Angels c. s.
1866-1867
Valentine or the opposed vocation 
The centenary of St Peter the Apostle 
Life of St Joseph 
News and stories 
1868
Severino, or the adventures of a young alpinist 
Marvels of the Mother of God 
Life of St John the Baptist 
Remembrance of a solemnity 
1869
The Catholic Church and its Hierarchy 
Association of the devotees of Mary, Help of Christians 
The General Councils and the Catholic Church 
Angelina, or the little orphan Girl of the Apennines 
(1870-1884)
Nine days consecrated to the august Mother of our Saviour 
Church History 
The Apparition of the Blessed Virgin at La Salette 
Pleasing facts from the life of Pius IX 
The centenary of St Eusebius the Great 
Massimino, or the encounter of a boy with a Protestant
The Jubilee of 1875 
Mary, Help of Christians 
The little cloud of Carmel
The loveliest flower of the apostolic college
The Catholic in the world
New stories of Luigi Comolli
 Series Started by Don Bosco
The friend of youth, a politico-religious paper (1849)
1851
Synoptic tablet (on the Catholic Church)
Flying leaflets
'Il Galantuomo'. A national almanac began (1854)
Salesian Bulletin (1877-current)
 Critical Works
Forty Dreams of St. John Bosco (critical edition published in 1977, originally published as a dream journal in 1855)
The Preventive System in the Education of the Youth (1877)
A Compendium of Italian History from the Fall of the Roman Empire (1881)
 Posthumous Works 
Memoirs of the Oratory of Saint Francis de Sales (written between 1815 and 1855, published posthumously in 1989)
The spiritual writings of Saint John Bosco (1984)
Dreams, Visions, and Prophecies of Don Bosco (1999)
The Unpublished Don Bosco (compiled by Mario Balbi and published in 2005)

Death and canonisation
Saint Bosco died on 31 January 1888. His funeral was attended by thousands. The Archdiocese of Turin investigated, and witnesses were called to determine if Bosco was worthy to be declared a saint. The Salesians, Daughters, and Cooperators gave supportive testimonies. Pope Pius XI had known Bosco and pushed the cause forward. Pius XI beatified Bosco on 2 June 1929 and canonised him on Easter Sunday (1 April) of 1934, when he was given the title of "Father and Teacher of Youth".

Pope Pius XII proclaimed him patron saint of Catholic publishers in 1949. His repertoire of writings and publications consists of over 220 titles collected in 38 volumes. They were printed at his own peerless paper-to-print workshop where boys learned the art of printing and publishing in view of future employment.

Bosco had been popularly known as the patron saint of illusionists, on 30 January 2002, Silvio Mantelli petitioned Pope John Paul II to declare Bosco formally to the patron of stage magicians. Catholic stage magicians who practice gospel magic venerate Bosco by offering free magic shows to underprivileged children on his feast day.

Bosco's work was carried on by an early pupil, collaborator, and companion, Michael Rua, who was appointed rector major of the Salesian Society by Pope Leo XIII in 1888.

He is remembered in the Church of England with a commemoration on 31 January.

In popular culture
Giovanni Bosco is the patron saint of Brasília, which he supposedly foresaw in a dream concerning an extraordinary new civilization that would flourish in central Brazil.

Many educational institutions are named after him, in countries as diverse as Australia, India, the Philippines, Pakistan, and the United States.

Several institutions in Engadine, New South Wales were also named for Bosco, including St John Bosco Parish, St John Bosco Primary School, and St John Bosco College.

Bosco was the subject of the 1935 biopic Don Bosco, directed by Goffredo Alessandrini, and was played by the actor Gian Paolo Rosmino. Bosco was also the subject of two Italian movies: Don Bosco (1988) and Saint John Bosco: Mission to Love (2004).

A borough in Quilmes, Argentina, is named after him.

An Italian church, San Giovanni Bosco, is named after him in Montreal, Canada, in the Ville-Émard area.

References

Bibliography

General

Publications of the Holy See

Publications of the Salesians of Don Bosco

Further reading

Publications of the Salesians of Don Bosco

 A 7-volume series.

 Translation of

External links

 
 
 
 
 
 
 
 
 

1815 births
1888 deaths
People from the Province of Asti
Clergy from Turin
Founders of Catholic religious communities
Italian Roman Catholic saints
19th-century Christian saints
Incorrupt saints
Salesian Order
Canonizations by Pope Pius XI
Writers from Turin
Anglican saints
Beatifications by Pope Pius XI